"How Do You Solve a Problem Like Camilla?" is an episode of the 2009 documentary drama The Queen which aired on Channel 4. The episode centres on Queen Elizabeth II's understanding of Charles and Camilla's relationship.

Summary
The Queen (Diana Quick) is having a difficult time accepting Camilla Parker Bowles (Joanna Van Gyseghem) into the royal family. Prince Charles (Martin Turner) however declares the relationship with Camilla as non-negotiable. With time, the Queen accepts their relationship and marriage.

Cast
 Diana Quick as Queen Elizabeth II 
 Joanna Van Gyseghem as Camilla Parker Bowles
 Martin Turner as Prince Charles
 June Bailey as Queen Elizabeth The Queen Mother
 Rick Bacon as Mark Bolland
 Robert Ashby as King Constantine II of Greece
 Davyd Harries as Clergyman

See also
Whatever Love Means (2005 television movie)

References

External links
 

2009 television specials
Channel 4 documentaries
Camilla, Queen Consort
2000s British documentary television series
2000s British drama television series
Films about Elizabeth II
Cultural depictions of Elizabeth II